Opava is a city in the Moravian-Silesian Region, Czech Republic.

Opava may also refer to:

 Opava District, a district (okres) within Moravian-Silesian Region of the Czech Republic with capital at Opava
 Opava, Veľký Krtíš District, a village in the Banská Bystrica Region of Slovakia
 Opava (river), a river in the Czech Republic
 Duchy of Opava was a historic territory centered on the city of Opava

See also 
 Opawa, a suburb of Christchurch, New Zealand
 Opawa (disambiguation)
 Dukes of Opava, a list of people carrying the title Duke of Opava